Rebuilding American Infrastructure with Sustainability and Equity (RAISE), previously called 
Better Utilizing Investments to Leverage Development (BUILD), and Transportation Investment Generating Economic Recovery (TIGER), is a supplementary discretionary grant program included in the American Recovery and Reinvestment Act of 2009. The legislation provided $1.5 billion for a National Surface Transportation System through September 30, 2011, "to be awarded on a competitive basis for capital investments in surface transportation projects".

Requirements

The U.S. government designed TIGER grants in order to incentivize bettering environmental problems and reducing the United States' dependence on energy. On the economic front, the United States hopes infrastructure investment will encourage job creation, a pressing political priority; this would likely require the project to be shovel-ready.

Eligible applicants
Applicants eligible to receive funding for surface transportation projects include:
 State and local governments, including U.S. territories and regional tribal councils
 Transit agencies
 Port authorities
 Metropolitan planning organizations (MPOs)
 Multi-state or multi-jurisdictional applicants

Qualifications
Qualified projects should result in "desirable, long-term outcomes" for the United States, a state within, or a regional or metropolitan area. According to Title 23 of the United States Code, eligible projects could include improvements to interstate highways, reworking of interchanges, bridge replacements, earthquake-related improvements, relocating roads, upgrading rural collector roads, certain transit projects, passenger and freight rail transportation projects, and port infrastructure. Selected projects might improve the economy of the entire country, transportation safety, and quality of life for communities.

Funding history

TIGER I (2009)
U.S. Secretary of Transportation Ray LaHood announced the TIGER discretionary grants program on February 4, 2009. Lana T. Hurdle, deputy assistant secretary for budget and programs, and Joel Szabat, deputy assistant secretary for transportation policy, co-chaired the team responsible for selecting projects and monitoring spending. Out of nearly 1,400 applications who collectively submitted $60 billion in applications, the Department of Transportation was only able to award $1.5 billion in TIGER grant funds to a just 3% of applicants—51 innovative projects.

TIGER II (2010)
The U.S. Departments of Transportation and Housing and Urban Development, and Related Agencies Appropriations Act for 2010 made $600 million available for transportation infrastructure investment.

TIGER III (2011)
On June 30, 2011, Secretary LaHood announced that nearly $527 million would go towards the third round of TIGER fund disbursal. On December 15, 2011, that $511 million from the TIGER grant program would fund 46 transportation projects in 33 states and Puerto Rico.

TIGER IV (2012)
The fourth round of TIGER funding—close to $500 million—went to 47 transportation projects in 34 states and the District of Columbia. For fiscal year 2012, Democratic districts won projects that concern ports, multimodal transport, and freight rail transport; receiving 24% of total funds, rural areas also performed strongly.

TIGER 2013
Although federal funding no longer referred to the funding allocations as TIGER grants, the US DOT continued to allocate these funds according to the same formula and continued to use the TIGER name. In 2013, 51 projects received TIGER funds, totaling approximately $458.3 million.

TIGER 2014
In 2014, the US Congress appropriated $600 million for TIGER funds. The US DOT received 797 applications requesting more than $9.5 billion. Seventy-two capital and planning projects in 46 states and the District of Columbia were selected for funding that totaled more than $584 million.

TIGER 2015
The seventh round of TIGER grants generated 625 applications requesting $9.8 billion worth of projects; of those projects, 60 were road projects, 18 percent were transit projects, and eight percent were rail projects, and port and bicycle and pedestrian projects made up six percent of the total.

References

External links
 BUILD grants official website
Presidency of Barack Obama